The Goseibai Shikimoku (御成敗式目) or the Formulary of Adjudications was the legal code of the Kamakura shogunate in Japan, promulgated by third shikken Hōjō Yasutoki on 27 August 1232. It is also called Jōei Shikimoku (貞永式目) after the era name.

Before enacting the Goseibai Shikimoku, the Kamakura shogunate conducted trials without formal laws. After the Jōkyū War, an increasing number of land disputes between its vassals, aristocrats and peasants made fair trials indispensable. Thereafter Hōjō Yasutoki compiled the outline with 51 article headings and 13 Hyojoshu (councilors) completed it.

Supplementary articles to the Goseibai Shikimoku, called Tsuika (追加), were issued afterward. The Muromachi shogunate also adopted the Goseibai Shikimoku as the basic law. The Goseibai Shikimoku was largely repealed during the Edo period, though parts of it stayed in used until 1868, but was widely used as a textbook for writing in temple schools.

References 

Legal history of Japan